The Ford Mondeo I (first generation) is a mid-size car that was produced by Ford, beginning on 23 November 1992, with sales beginning on 22 March 1993. It is also known as the Mk I Mondeo; the 1996 facelift versions are usually designated Mk II. Available as a four-door saloon, a five-door hatchback, and a five-door estate, all models for the European market were produced at Ford's plant in the Belgian city of Genk. In December 1992, Autocar published a section on the Mondeo, and how it would conquer rivals.

Intended as a world car, it replaced the Ford Sierra in Europe, the Ford Telstar in a large portion of Asia and other markets, while the Ford Contour and Mercury Mystique replaced the Ford Tempo and Mercury Topaz in North America. Despite being billed as a world car, the only external items the Mondeo shared initially with the Contour were the windscreen, front windows, front mirrors and door handles. Thus, the CDW27 project turned out not to be a true world car in the sense that the original Ford Focus and newer Fords developed under the "One Ford" policy turned out to be. The first generation Mondeo was replaced in 2000, by the larger second generation; in the United States and Canada, the Contour/Mystique were replaced initially by the Focus and later the Fusion.

Design and development

Mk I 
Instigated in 1986 (just before its Sierra predecessor received a major facelift), the design of the car cost Ford US$6 billion. It was one of the most expensive new-car programmes ever. The Mondeo was significant as its design and marketing were shared between Ford USA in Dearborn and Ford of Europe. Its codename while under development reflected thus: CDW27 signified that it straddled the C and D size classes and was a "world car". The head of the Mondeo project was John Oldfield, headquartered at Ford Dunton in Essex.

A large proportion of the high development cost was due to the Mondeo being a completely new design, sharing very little, if anything, with the Ford Sierra. Unlike the Sierra, the Mondeo is front-wheel drive in its most common form, with a rarer four-wheel drive version available on the Mk I car only. Over-optimistically, the floor pan was designed to accept virtually any conceivable drivetrain, from a transverse inline-four engine to a longitudinal V-8. This resulted in a hugely intrusive and mostly disused bellhousing cover and transmission tunnel. Resultingly the front interior, especially the footwells, feels more cramped than would be expected from a vehicle of this size. The Mondeo featured new manual and automatic transmissions and sophisticated suspension design, which give it class-leading handling and ride qualities, and subframes front and rear to give it executive car refinement. The automatic transmission featured electronic control with sport and economy modes plus switchable overdrive. The program manager from 1988, and throughout its early development, was David Price.

By 1989, Ford had confirmed that it would be launching an all-new front-wheel drive car to replace the Sierra within the next four years, although it had not yet decided whether the Sierra name would continue or be replaced, with some subsequent reports even hinting that the Cortina name could make a comeback, having been axed in 1982 when replaced by the Sierra. Several prototypes were tested that year, but the launch of the Nissan Primera in 1990 prompted Ford to make a number of major alterations to the final product, as it saw the new competitor from Nissan to be the benchmark car in this sector, having previously identified the Honda Accord as the class leader.

The car was launched in the midst of turbulent times at Ford of Europe, when the division was haemorrhaging hundreds of millions of dollars, and had gained a reputation in the motoring press for selling products which had been designed by accountants rather than engineers. The fifth-generation Escort and third-generation Orion of 1990 was the zenith of this cost-cutting/high-price philosophy, which was by then beginning to backfire on Ford, with the cars being slated for their substandard ride and handling, though a facelift in 1992 had seen things improve a little. The Sierra had sold well, but not as well as the all-conquering Cortina before it, and in Britain, it had been overtaken in the sales charts by the newer Vauxhall Cavalier. Previously loyal customers were already turning to rival European and Japanese products, and by the time of the Mondeo's launch, the future of Europe as a Ford manufacturing base was hanging in the balance. The new car had to be good, and it had to sell. It was unveiled to the public on 23 November 1992, although sales would not begin for another four months. At this stage, Ford confirmed that the new car would feature a completely new name and would be called the Mondeo.

Safety was a high priority in the Mondeo design, with a driver's side airbag (it was the first-ever car sold from the beginning with a driver's airbag in all of its versions, which helped it achieve the European Car of the Year title for 1994), side-impact bars, seat belt pretensioners, and antilock braking systems (higher models) as standard features. Other features for its year included adaptive damping, self-leveling suspension (top estate models), traction control (V6 and 4WD versions), and heated front windscreen, branded Quickclear.

The interiors were usually well-appointed, featuring velour trim, an arm rest with CD and tape storage, central locking (frequently remote), power windows (all round on higher models), power mirrors, illuminated entry, flat-folding rear seats, etc. Higher-specification models had leather seats, trip computers, electric sunroof, CD changer, and alloy wheels.

During its development, Ford used the 1986 Honda Accord and in the later stages the 1990 Nissan Primera as the class benchmarks that the CDW27 had to beat.

Mk II (facelift) 

The mid-cycle facelift, launched in October 1996, addressed three of the original Mondeo's biggest criticisms: its bland styling, the poor headlight performance, the reflectors of which quickly yellowed, and the cramped rear legroom. The lowering of specification levels around that time, such as air conditioning and alloy wheels, became optional on the UK Ghia models and may have indicated a desire by Ford to cut costs and recoup some of the considerable sums invested in the original design. These specification levels were improved again in 1998 as the Mondeo approached replacement.

The facelift left only the doors, the roof, and the rear quarter panels on the estate the same as the original model. Even the extractor vents on the rear doors were replaced by a panel bearing the name Mondeo. The most notable change was the introduction of the grille and larger, wraparound lighting units. The saloon version featured some distinctive rear lights. These incorporated an additional reflector panel that extended around the top and the side of the rear wings. Unlike the iterations seen on the heavily facelifted Scorpio and Mk IV Fiesta during the previous year, this facelift was well received.

The interior was also mildly revised, though the basic dashboard architecture was the same as before. Safety specification was improved, with the car gaining a full-sized driver airbag in place of the smaller 'euro-bag' fitted in the Mk I Mondeo. The Mk II gained a 'flagged' three-star rating in Euro NCAP testing, which was average for rivals of its time (the same as the Vauxhall Vectra, better than the Citroën Xantia and Peugeot 406, and worse than the Nissan Primera). The cars' structure suffered excessive footwell intrusion in the frontal impact and a disturbing B-pillar displacement in the side test.

The Zetec engine was thoroughly revised in 1998. The updated version was far more refined at high revolutions. In December 1998, Ford released in Europe a sports car with a coupé body shell based upon the Mk II Mondeo called the Ford Cougar (or Mercury Cougar in North America). This car shared the engines (2.0 I4, 2.5 V6), transmissions, suspension (partially) and floorpans from the Mondeo, but the body shell was unique to the Cougar, and was one of the last Ford cars to be designed under Ford's New Edge philosophy.

Engines 

Along with an all-new platform, the Mondeo also used Ford's then-new Zetec engines, first seen in 1991 in the Ford Escort, Ford Orion and Ford Fiesta.

Three versions of the 16-valve Zetec engine were used.

An alternative to the Zetec engines was the Endura-D 1.8 L turbo-diesel. This engine had origins in the older 1.6 L diesel design (which in itself was based on the petrol OHV Kent engine block from the Mk1-2 Escort and Mk1 Fiesta) and was used in the Fiesta and elsewhere. Although not without merits, it was not seen as a strong competitor to other European diesels such as that produced by Peugeot. The contrast between this unit and the competition seemed enormous by the time the engine was dropped in 2000. Strangely, the diesel-powered vehicles could easily be distinguished by dint of their having a slightly redesigned grille so that more air would flow to the top mounted intercooler.

A new American designed V6 engine was introduced in 1994 as part of a model line-up review, in the form of the  2.5 L 24-valve V6 Duratec unit, primarily included for markets where four-cylinder petrol engines are not favored and are usually intended for the upmarket European buyer. This engine, first unveiled in the Mondeo's North American cousin, the Ford Contour, is characterized by its smooth operation, chain-driven camshafts, and additional butterflies in the lower inlet to close of the inlet path to one valve, giving better torque at low engine speeds, this was vacuum operated on the Mk1 and electronically controlled on the Mk2. This engine was originally branded 24v on the Mk1, but later on badged as the more glamorous sounding V6.

This engine was also used to introduce the new "ST" brand to the Mondeo range as a flagship model (with less specification than a Ghia or a Ghia X), the ST24 in 1997. The bodykit option was listed as a delete option for those who did not want it fitted as standard.

Although neither of these models ever sold in high numbers, the marketing was important to Ford, as it was an introduction to the ST range as a sportier side to the full range, especially significant as apart from the Focus RS, both the XR and RS model ranges were phased out during the 1990s.

Ford briefly sold a version using the 2.0 L Zetec engine and four-wheel drive, available between 1995 and 1996 on cars with Si, Ghia, and Ghia X trim and in 1997 on the Mk2 in some European countries.

Market

Europe 
The 1992–1996 range had the following trim levels:

UK market
Base – 1.6L Zetec, 1.8 L turbodiesel, base trim level, 4-door saloon, 5-door hatchback, estate (replaced by Aspen in 1995)
Aspen – 1.6 L Zetec, 1.8 L turbodiesel, base trim level, 5-door hatchback, estate
LX – 1.6 L/1.8 L/2.0 L Zetec, 1.8 L turbodiesel, midrange trim level, 4-door saloon, 5-door hatchback, estate
GLX – 1.6 L/1.8 L/2.0 L Zetec, 1.8 L turbodiesel, luxury trim level version of the LX, 4-door saloon, 5-door hatchback, estate
24v – 2.5L Duratec V6, 4-door saloon, 5-door hatchback, estate (1994–1995 only) with sports seats and 15” steel wheels and trims
Si – 2.0 L 4-cylinder with shorter ratio gearbox, 2.5 L Duratec V6 (Sept 1995- Aug 1996 only), sports version, 4-door saloon, 5-door hatchback, estate, optional 4x4 on 2.0L Zetec
Ghia – 1.8 L/2.0 L Zetec, 2.5 L Duratec V6, 1.8 L turbodiesel, midrange trim level, 4-door saloon, 5-door hatchback, estate, optional 4x4 on 2.0L Zetec
Ghia X – (1995-1996 only) 2.0L Zetec, 2.5 L Duratec V6, 1.8L turbodiesel, luxury trim level, 4-door saloon, 5-door hatchback, 5-door estate (from 1995), optional 4x4 on 2.0L Zetec

Special edition versions included the 1.8 L Ultima (1993-1994 only) and 1.8 L, 1.8 L turbodiesel Verona (1995-1996 only) models which included a mix of lower and higher model components and exclusive interior trims.

The Mk1 was available with a factory or dealer option, RS bodykit, from 1993 to 1995, consisting of additional front and rear aerodynamic bumper styling which was bonded to the factory bumpers, side skirts and a boot lid mounted spoiler on all body shapes, together with a choice of 15” and 16” alloy wheels.  A more subtle bodykit was offered as an option from Sept 1995 to Aug 1996 consisting of complete replacement bumpers with round front fog lights and smooth side skirts, the boot spoilers had an additional high level brake light added.

A special edition version of the 2.0 Si was available in 1993–1994 in limited numbers and came in Citrine Yellow with a special version of the Si seat fabric and included the full RS bodykit, these were issued to each Ford Dealer as a promotional tool for sale and an even smaller number of these cars (~50) were tuned by a dealer, Hendy Ford and fitted with different camshafts, producing approximately 150 PS and were identified by special graphics on the sides.

Additional trim levels in other European markets included:

Mirage – 1.6 L Zetec, base trim level, 4-door saloon, 5-door hatchback, estate – only offered in the Netherlands
CLX – 1.6 L/1.8 L/2.0 L Zetec, 1.8 L turbodiesel, midrange trim level, 4-door saloon, 5-door hatchback, estate – not offered in the UK
Verona – 1.8 L, midrange trim level, 4-door saloon, 5-door hatchback
GLX – 1.6 L/1.8 L/2.0 L Zetec, 1.8 L turbodiesel, luxury trim level version of the CLX, 4-door saloon, 5-door hatchback, estate
Business Edition – 1.6 L/1.8 L/2.0 L 4-cylinder, 2.5 L V6, 1.8 L turbodiesel, luxury trim level version of LX, 4-door saloon, 5-door hatchback, estate. – only offered in the Netherlands
GT – 1.8 L/2.0 L 4-cylinder, 2.5 L V6, 1.8 L turbodiesel, sports version, 4-door saloon, 5-door hatchback, estate. Only offered in the Netherlands, equivalent to UK-spec Si
V6 – 2.5 L V6, luxury version, 4-door saloon, 5-door hatchback, estate. Never offered with a V6 (base) in the Netherlands, only Business Edition or GT.

The 1996–2000 range had the following trim levels:
Aspen – 1.6 L Zetec, 1.8 L TD Endura, base trim level, 5dr, Estate
LX – 1.6/1.8/2.0 L Zetec, 1.8 L TD Endura, midrange trim level, 4dr, 5dr, Estate
Verona – 1.8 L Zetec, midrange trim level, 5dr
GLX – 1.8/2.0 L Zetec, 1.8 L TD Endura, midrange trim level, 4dr, 5dr, Estate
Si – 2.0 L Zetec, 2.5 L V6 170 PS, sports version, 4dr, 5dr, Estate
Zetec – 1.8/2.0 L Zetec, replaced Si, 5dr, Estate
Zetec-S – 2.0 L Zetec, rare Zetec based special edition with ST bodykit, 5dr
Ghia – 2.0 L Zetec, 2.5 L V6 170 PS, 1.8 L TD Endura, luxury trim level
Ghia X – 2.0 L Zetec, 2.5 L V6 170 PS, 1.8 L TD Endura, top spec trim level
ST24 – 2.5 L V6 170 PS, Sports Variant Luxury bucket seat half leather trim, sports-suspension, RSAP Kit
ST200 – 2.5 L V6 205 PS, Sports Variant, Luxury Recaro leather trim, 17" alloys, tuned engine & suspension, RSAP Kit, digital Climate Control

The facelifted Mk II Mondeo sports variants included the ST24 and the ST200. The ST24 produced  from its 2.5-litre V6 24v engine and was launched with Rally Sport Appearance Pack body kits, along with sports suspension and half-leather sports bucket seats. North America got an SE "Sport" Version of the Contour, which featured exclusive wheels and the coveted 9-inch Sport Drum rear brakes. Rear disc brakes eventually became available in North America on certain Contour and Mystique models, although some customers bemoaned the reduced level of feel over the original sport drums.

The ST200 was then launched as the Enthusiast's car, with a tuned 2.5-litre V6 24v engine producing . Tuning included a different throttle body, cams, flywheel, and upper manifold,  to name a few. This version of the Mondeo also had even harder sports suspension than the ST24, and came with half-leather Recaro sports bucket seats, full leather was available as a cost option. The ST200 was released to the public in Imperial Blue (All Countries due to receive the ST200) and additionally in Europe, Stardust Silver, Panther Black and Radiant Red. 66 were also made in Diamond White 73 (for use by various UK police forces). The North American counterpart to this model was known as the Contour SVT.

Africa 
In South Africa, the trim levels offered were:
LX – 1.8 L Zetec, midrange trim level, 4-door saloon
CLX – 2.0 L Zetec, midrange trim level, 4-door saloon
2.0 Aspen – 2.0 L Zetec, luxury trim level version of the LX, 4-door saloon
Si – 2.5 L V6, sports version, 5-door hatchback

South America 
In Brazil, the trim levels offered were:
CLX – 1.8 L Zetec, standard trim level, 4-door saloon, 5-door hatchback, and 5-door station wagon.
GLX – 2.0 L Zetec, midrange trim level, 4-door saloon and 5-door hatchback, and 5-door station wagon.
Ghia – 2.5 L V6 Duratec HE, Luxury&Sport trim level version, only was 4-door saloon.

Ford Contour and Mercury Mystique 

The Ford Contour and its rebadged Mercury variant, the Mercury Mystique, are North American versions of the first-generation Ford Mondeo, marketed for model years 1995-2000 as a four-door sedan, replacing the Ford Tempo and Mercury Topaz.   Production at Kansas City Assembly in Claycomo, Missouri, and Cuautitlán Assembly started on August 15, 1994.

Derived directly from (and developed together with) the Ford Mondeo Mk 1, the Contour and Mystique shared the Ford CDW27 platform with its European counterpart.  In contrast to the first Ford "world car" (the 1981 Ford Escort), the Contour was redesigned slightly to better suit American demands. The three shared major systems, including body structure, powertrain, and suspension.

While officially classified a mid-size car, the Contour was among the smallest sedans in the segment, with its interior dimensions becoming a point of criticism.

The Contour and Mystique shared two engines with the Mondeo, a 125 hp 2.0 L Zetec inline-4 and a 170 hp 2.5 L Duratec V6; the 1.8L turbodiesel of the Mondeo was never sold in North America.  A five-speed manual transmission was standard with both engines, with a four-speed automatic offered with as an option.

The Ford Contour was produced with three trim levels: base-trim GL (1995-1997), a higher-content LX, and a sporty SE trim.  The 2.0L engine was standard on GL and LX versions, with the 2.5L standard on SE-trim examples.  As a running change during 1996, a "Sport" option package was introduced for GL and SE-trim models.  The Mercury Mystique was produced with two trim levels: standard-trim GS and higher-trim LS (with a "Sport" option package available for both versions); from 1997 to 1999, an undesignated base-trim Mystique was offered.

Facelift 
Released in January 1997 for model year 1998, Ford introduced a updated version of the Contour and Mystique with redesigned front fascia, front and rear quarter panels, headlamps and taillamps.  All three models added the model name to the rear door behind the passenger window (with Mercury adding its brand emblem).

For 1998, a high-performance version variant of the Ford Contour was introduced, the Ford SVT Contour (in line with the larger Ford Taurus SHO).  For 1999, the Ford Mondeo would introduce the ST200 trim; while sharing the powertrain of the SVT Contour, the Mondeo ST200 adapted different chassis and interior modifications from the SVT Contour.

Ford SVT Contour 
The SVT Contour was a modified version of the Ford Contour sedan from Ford's in-house Special Vehicle Team, with all examples sourced from Kansas City Assembly.  It was powered by an upgraded version of the 2.5 L V6, producing 195 hp (200 hp from 1999).  Paired solely with a 5-speed manual transmission, the vehicle underwent handling and performance upgrades, including re-tuned suspension, upgraded brakes, larger wheels and high-performance tires, along with the installation of different seats, trim, white-face instruments, and new bodywork.  In line with Ford Mustang SVT Cobras, the Ford SVT Contour was available primarily by special order at specially designated Ford dealerships.

The SVT Contour was produced from 1997 to 2000, with a major running change during 1998 (effectively making a 1998.5 model year for the variant).

Engines 
 2.0 L Zetec I4 125 hp (97 kW)
 2.5 L Duratec 25 V6 170 hp (125 kW)
 2.5 L Duratec 25 V6 195 hp (145 kW) (1998 SVT)
 2.5 L Duratec 25 V6 200 hp (149 kW) (1999 and 2000 SVT)

Model year changes 
1996
The backs of the front seats were recessed, improving rear seat leg room.
Rear seat cushions were repositioned to increase room.
Chrome bumper strips were dropped, resulting in bumpers that were monochromatic.
Seven-spoke alloy wheels become standard for SE model.
Split rear seats now available on all models.
The powertrain control module was changed to the newer EEC-V to be OBD-II compliant.
Manual transmission was reworked for easier shifts.

1997
New value-priced base models were introduced in late 1997 for both Contour and Mystique.
Traction control is dropped as an option.
Added interior trunk light
Steering wheels now tilt
Heated mirrors are dropped as an option.
"Unleaded fuel only" label was removed from the fuel gauge.
Various interior plastic pieces and covers on the Contour are no longer spray-painted silver and are left black.
Remote fuel door release is dropped.
Mystique – optional CD player and power front seats on GS, standard on LS

1998
New design for front and rear fascias, including a chrome grille surround and larger headlights; Mystique gets side Mercury emblems on the rear quarter windows.
Mystique's interior also received new fabric choices (leather seating, previously optional, became standard on LS models) and faux wood trim to make it more upscale than the Contour.
Five-speed manual transmission changed from rod shift to cable shift.
High-performance Contour SVT version debuts, available only in Silver Frost, Toreador Red, and Black Ebony with Midnight Blue interior.
Roof line altered and the rear deck shortened for improved rear seat headroom
Seat recliner is changed from a knob to a lever.
Seatbelt for rear center seat is improved from two-point to three-point.
New center consoles; pop-up cup holders are replaced and are now molded into the console.
Glove box light, underhood light, lighted sun visors, and door handle lights are removed.
Integrated rear child-safety seats are optional on the Mystique.
Warning lights on the instrument cluster were relocated to different spots. Moldings stayed the same.
The red empty marker on the fuel gauge was left white.
Less forceful "second-generation" airbags were made standard.

1998.5
In mid-production for the 1998 model (manufactured after February 1998), Ford decided to make several more changes to the SVT Contour. This resulted in a noticeable distinction between early and late 1998 SVT Contours. To differentiate between the two, the late 1998 model is sometimes referred to as the "1998.5", or alternatively the early 1998 model as the "E0" and the late 1998 model as the "E1". The mid-year changes are as listed below.
Split rear seats are now available only on the SE model.
In-dash clock is relocated to the stereo head unit display.
New Cobra-style SVT aluminum alloy wheels
SVT-specific Goodyear Eagle F1 tires replace Goodyear GS-C tires. The 205/55-16 size is retained.
Different strut valving and tires raised skid pad numbers from .84 to .90 G.
The word "normal" was removed from the temperature gauge. "C" for cool and "H" for hot were added.

1999
All models are equipped with a slightly larger fuel tank at 15.4 gallons.
A slight change was made in dash design. The plastic piece around front window was eliminated.
Seats were again altered for additional rear leg room.
The 2.0 L I4 engine received an additional 5 hp
Contour SVT engine rating was upped 5 hp to 200 hp due to additional abrasive flow machining of the primary and secondary intake ports.
SVT is offered in Tropic Green.
SVT gains tan leather interior for Tropic Green and Toreador Red, and optional on Black Ebony cars.
SVT gets new BF Goodrich KDW tires. Size changes to 215/50-16.
Revised transmission synchronizers addressed an issue in the 1998 SVT.
Mystique's suspension was tuned for a softer ride.

2000
Displacement on the Duratec V6 engine decreased slightly, but the compression ratio was increased to compensate. This was done to keep the engine used in Mazda vehicles to maintain a lower engine displacement based tax level in Japan.
Ground effect side skirts on the Contour SE Sport were discontinued
Rear spoiler option was added for the SVT
Four-cylinder Contour models continued as fleet vehicles only.
Mystique GS and LS models returned with emergency in-trunk releases. Mercury pulled the Mystique from its lineup early in the 2000 model year.  Production ended for the Mystique on December 23, 1999, but Contour production continued into late fall of 2000 to support rental fleets.
The last Ford Contour rolled off the assembly line on October 19, 2000.
Ford narrowed its lineup, with the most similar replacement for the Contour, the Fusion, not debuting until 2006

Reception 
Both the Contour and Mystique were praised for their handling and ride quality, and were even dubbed "A fun four-door sedan that offered European moves at American prices" in an Edmunds review.  For the SVT trim, Edmunds.com named the Contour SVT the most wanted sedan under $25,000 for 1999

The Contour and Mystique were on Car and Driver magazine's Ten Best list for 1995, 1996 and 1997. Although Car and Driver staff wrote an article in 2009 apologizing for the inclusion of the Ford Contour on the "Ten Best" list, it was the only car the staff did not outright recant from the list, but did cite that, in hindsight, the car should have been considered too small for its price range to properly meet criteria, and that this is the likely reason for the car's failure to achieve widespread appeal.

The Ford Contour was also named as an Automobile magazine All Star for 1995, 1996, 1997, and 1998.

Safety 
The Insurance Institute for Highway Safety gave the Contour a "Poor" overall rating in the frontal impact crash. The head, neck, and chest were all well protected and the dummy movement was well controlled, but excessive footwell intrusion contributed to high forces on both legs and a "Marginal" structural rating. The Contour received five stars for both the driver and passenger in the NHTSA test.

Sales 
In Europe, the Mondeo was instantly declared a class leader. It was elected Car of the Year in 1994, ahead of PSA's new Xantia model. The facelifted Mondeo was initially popular, being Britain's third-best selling new car in 1996 through to 1998. However, in 1999 it dipped into sixth place and had been outsold by its biggest rival, the Vauxhall Vectra.

However, the Contour/Mondeo struggled to compete in North America and Australia. In the United States and Canada, the Contour suffered from market incompatibility with the preceding Ford Tempo, which by the end of its production run was an outdated design from the mid-1980s which sold primarily on its low price to lower-end customers and fleets.  In contrast, the Contour was significantly more expensive as Ford hoped to sell it on its redeeming qualities, instead; a base model Contour was several hundred dollars more expensive than a loaded Tempo LX, pricing it out of the market for prospective and returning Tempo customers. Customers in the Contour's price range were instead drawn to the Taurus which was larger and offered better value for money; large factory incentives on the outgoing Taurus throughout 1995 in anticipation of a completely redesigned model due to launch later that year helped the Taurus cut into the Contour's initial market. The Ford Focus then replaced the Contour after 2000.

Anticipating this, Ford moved the Taurus upmarket with the release of the redesigned 1996 model, but poor customer reception to the new model's design and high price forced Ford to heavily discount it and continuously reduce its base price through its life, reviving the in-showroom competition between the two models. Additionally, the Contour was hurt by strong competition in the medium segment by the other American automakers. The similarly priced Chrysler Cirrus, which was concurrently launched by the Chrysler Corporation for the 1995 model year, matched the Contour in design, performance and driving dynamics, but had more features and a larger interior. The 1996 launch of the lower-priced Chevrolet Malibu by General Motors further cut into Contour sales. The Mondeo faced similar issues in Australia, as it was hampered by stiff competition from Japanese competitors in an already limited medium-sized market while its high price drove prospective customers to the larger and better equipped Ford Falcon. Heavy fleet sales of the Taurus and Falcon, which led to a large volume of low-mileage, low-priced one- and two-year-old examples saturating the used vehicle market was also a factor in making the Contour/Mondeo a tough sell to respective American and Australian consumers.

However, another theory was advanced by some motoring journalists; because the Mondeo was developed in Europe with limited input from Ford's North American and Australian operations, executives at both operations were unenthusiastic about the car and had no qualms about letting it fail in the marketplace to allow for the continued success of their locally developed models. Ford withdrew the Mondeo and exited the medium-sized markets in both continents in 2000, not to return until the 2005 launch of the Fusion in North America and the 2007 return of the Mondeo in Australia. The Mondeo returned to North America in 2012 as the redesigned 2013 Fusion as part of the "One Ford" business plan. The redesigned Mondeos, due to their larger size, better prices, increased development input from Australian and American customers, and changing market demographics, proved successful in both continents.

The Mondeo was released in Australia in 1995, but was not a sales success, where, similarly, a much larger local model, the Falcon, was available, and was dropped in 2000. Ford Australia withdrew completely from the medium-sized segment of the Australian market, arguing that it was in decline. The estate version, the first medium-sized Ford of its kind to be sold in Australia since the Cortina, was dropped in 1999. It struggled against Japanese midsized models such as the Honda Accord and Subaru Liberty, as well as the Holden Vectra, also imported from Europe, although unlike the Mondeo, briefly assembled locally. The Mondeo has since returned to Australia in 2007 with an all-new model.

In Australia, the 1995 to 2000 Ford Mondeos were assessed in the Used Car Safety Ratings 2006 as providing "significantly better than average" protection for their occupants in the event of a crash.

The Mondeo launched in New Zealand to replace the Mazda 626-based Telstar following the closure of the Ford New Zealand assembly plant in 1997. Many earlier-model Mondeos, imported used from Japan, were also sold locally.

In 1997, the Mondeo was introduced into South Africa as a replacement for the Ford Telstar. It was produced locally at their Silverton plant in 1.8-litre and 2.0-litre saloon models. As production was limited to one body style, Estate (2.0-litre) Hatchback (2.5-litre V6) models were imported alongside the saloon models. The Mondeo was one of the first mainstream cars in South Africa to introduce airbags as standard equipment. Saloon sales were never a major success – fairly radical styling being cited as the main problem by a still conservative vehicle market. Styling was partly addressed by an Aspen model, which featured 15-inch alloy wheels, front fog lamps, and full leather trim.

In Taiwan, Ford Lio Ho produced a version of the Mondeo known as the Mondeo M2000, which had a front end similar to the outgoing Mercury Mystique, but with Ford badges. Its rear end was similar to that of the European models. This model was also exported to China.

References 

1st
Euro NCAP large family cars
Front-wheel-drive vehicles
All-wheel-drive vehicles
Hatchbacks
Sedans
Station wagons
Cars introduced in 1992
2000s cars